Grandfather Paradox, usually referred to as the Grandfather, is a fictional character in the British science fiction franchise Doctor Who and its spin-off franchise Faction Paradox. In the BBC's Eighth Doctor Adventures novels, the Grandfather is a corrupt future version of the Eighth Doctor, while in Lawrence Miles's Faction Paradox series he is a seemingly incorporeal Time Lord of unknown identity. Both narratives portray him as the founder of Faction Paradox, a time-travelling voodoo cult.

Fictional character biography

Doctor Who
In Lawrence Miles's Christmas on a Rational Planet, the Grandfather is referred to as the "voodoo priest of the House of Lungbarrow", suggesting he may have originated in the Doctor's own family.

In Lance Parkin's The Gallifrey Chronicles, the Doctor recalls his childhood, when his mother read him an ancient Gallifreyan legend about an adventurous youth. Ignoring his elders' warnings, the youth travelled into his own past and – with no clear motivation – murdered his own grandfather with an ordinary knife. The murder prevented the youth's birth, which prevented the murder, creating an irresolvable paradox. The youth was never heard from again, but legends said that he existed on some level as a being named Grandfather Paradox, a "shadowy half-man, simultaneously alive and dead, murderer and victim", always plotting against the Time Lords.

The Grandfather is the founder and leader of Faction Paradox, a time-travelling voodoo cult. Rejecting the ethos of Time Lord society, Faction Paradox members enjoy interfering with time travel and causing havoc and paradoxes. Their ritualistic practises and use of death imagery is a repudiation of the Time Lords' immortality. Rather than reproduce, Faction Paradox prefer to recruit outcasts, both from the Time Lords and lesser races such as humans.

At some point, Grandfather Paradox is captured by the Time Lords. They imprison him in Shada, their prison asteroid, declining to execute him because they fear him dead more than alive. In Christmas on a Rational Planet, the Carnival Queen disrupts the universe's rationality; this causes Lady President Romana to have an epileptic seizure in which she signs an order to release 300 prisoners. Grandfather Paradox leads the mass escape from Shada.

In Alien Bodies, the Grandfather sends two Faction Paradox representatives – Cousin Justine and Little Brother Manjuele – to an auction to bid for the body of the Doctor, who has been killed in a future War between the Time Lords, Faction Paradox and an unknown Enemy. The Grandfather plans to obtain the future Doctor's biodata and grow from its strength, but this is prevented by the Eighth Doctor, who destroys the body to prevent it from being used as a weapon. In the same book, the Doctor speculates that, like the Celestial Intervention Agency, the Grandfather has erased himself from history to become a being of pure concept.

The character makes his only direct appearance in The Ancestor Cell, where he is revealed to be a future Eighth Doctor, corrupted by Faction Paradox's biodata virus. The Grandfather takes command of Faction Paradox, planning to lead them to victory in the War and conquer both the Time Lords and the Enemy. The Doctor destabilises the TARDIS, which has been drawing energy from a bottle universe to contain the corrupt timeline where the virus infected him. The energy released erases Faction Paradox and the Grandfather from existence, at the cost of destroying Gallifrey. This sequence is revisited in a flashback in The Gallifrey Chronicles, which states that the Grandfather is the Doctor from 292 years into the future. The novel also states that the Grandfather is not just the Doctor's future self, but everyone's:

Faction Paradox
In The Faction Paradox Protocols audio series, it is revealed that Faction Paradox still possess the knife with which the Grandfather cut off his arm. The knife is stained with the Grandfather's dried blood – all that remains of him in the physical universe – and has become imbued with his "shadow". Faction Paradox members traditionally bond their chosen weapons to their shadows, allowing them to draw at any time and strike enemies without physically moving. After losing her shadow in an accident, Cousin Justine takes the Grandfather's knife and is bonded to his one-armed shadow, allowing her to access his seemingly infinite weapons instantly. Justine is later convicted by the Great Houses, as Faction Paradox custom dictates that she is now legally the Grandfather and therefore responsible for his crimes. She eventually escapes their prison asteroid, but begins to wonder if the Grandfather's shadow is driving her mad.

The Grandfather is revered in the Eleven-Day Empire, a version of London created when Faction Paradox purchased eleven days from the British government at the enactment of the Calendar (New Style) Act 1750. A statue of the Grandfather stands atop their version of Nelson's Column, and the speaker's chair in their version of the Palace of Westminster is always left empty, awaiting the Grandfather's return.

Appearance
The legends agree that Grandfather Paradox has only one arm, but which arm he lost and how he lost it are disputed. In The Ancestor Cell, the Grandfather claims that he cut it off to remove the criminal branding applied by the Time Lords after he committed atrocities against reality which he can no longer remember. At the novel's climax, the Eighth Doctor tells the Grandfather that he removed it because it was the arm with which he had destroyed Gallifrey.

In The Ancestor Cell, the Grandfather appears as an older, emaciated, sallow-skinned Eighth Doctor, with a shaved head, "hooded, glittering glacier-eyes", and an old hessian cloak; the Doctor's companion Fitz Kreiner, upon first seeing the Grandfather, thinks of him as looking like "the Doctor if he'd spent twenty years in the navy before becoming a psycho". In a flashback to the same events, The Gallifrey Chronicles offers a slightly different description of the Grandfather: his hair and skin are greying, and he wears a heavy leather cloak over the Eighth Doctor's original frock coat, which is now faded and cobwebbed. His movements are subtly different from the Doctor's, the loss of an arm having changed his centre of balance. The novel also suggests that the Grandfather's appearance varies, and that anyone who looks him in the eye will see themselves staring back.

Conceptual history
The character was first mentioned in Lawrence Miles's 1995 novel Christmas on a Rational Planet, which briefly describes his escape from Shada. Miles named the character in reference to the grandfather paradox, a thought experiment in which a time traveller kills their own grandfather, preventing their own birth, which prevents the murder, and so on in a paradoxical loop.

The Grandfather influences events in several of Miles's later novels, but he never appears directly and is never identified. This changes in The Ancestor Cell, written by Peter Anghelides and Stephen Cole under incoming editor Justin Richards. In his review of the novel, Miles decried the revelation that the Grandfather is a future Doctor as "crass and predictable", labelling this version of the character as "just the Valeyard with a new haircut". Miles cited the lack of logic in having a more experienced Doctor outwitted by his younger self, declaring the resolution "obviously not true". All subsequent Faction Paradox stories written or edited by Miles ignore the revelations of The Ancestor Cell, leaving the Grandfather's identity a mystery.

In a 2001 interview, Miles stated that he never meant the Grandfather to appear in person, comparing him to the Doctor's name or Judge Dredd's face as something that loses all value when revealed. He concluded, "If I had to have him appear in person, I'd probably make him Ronnie Barker in Porridge. The Norman Stanley Fletcher of Shada. With one arm."

In the second edition of their Doctor Who reference book AHistory, Lance Parkin and Lars Pearson attempt to reconcile the War depicted in the Eighth Doctor Adventures novels with the Last Great Time War depicted in the revived series of Doctor Who. They suggest that Grandfather Paradox is the Doctor who fought in the Last Great Time War, and that his experiences left him scarred and callous, without faith in humanity. After failing to prevent the younger Eighth Doctor from destroying Gallifrey in The Ancestor Cell, Grandfather Paradox regenerates into Christopher Eccleston's Ninth Doctor, regrowing his arm in the process. Parkin notes that this would explain the Ninth Doctor's conflicted recollection of Gallifrey's destruction in the episode "Dalek": "I watched it happen… I made it happen… I tried to stop it".

References

External links

Faction Paradox
Fictional aikidoka
Fictional amputees
Literary characters introduced in 1996
Fictional cult leaders
Fictional characters who committed familicide
Fictional outlaws
Fictional priests and priestesses
Fictional prison escapees
Fictional undead
Doctor Who book characters
Doctor Who Doctors
Male characters in literature
Time Lords
Unseen characters